James George Tizzard (born 12 November 1982) is a former English county cricketer. Tizzard was a right-handed batsman who bowled right-arm medium-fast.

Tizzard made a single List-A appearance for Dorset in the 2nd round of the 2002 Cheltenham & Gloucester Trophy, which was played in 2001 against Scotland. Tizzard was out caught off the bowling of Damien Wright in his only List-A innings.  Tizzard also made a single Minor Counties Championship against Wiltshire in 2001.  He is now located in Dubai working in the Oil and Gas market sector.  He currently plays league cricket for the Infidels Cricket Club in the Last Man Stands Cricket League.

References

External links
James Tizzard at Cricinfo
James Tizzard at CricketArchive

1982 births
Living people
People from Isleworth
Cricketers from Greater London
English cricketers
Dorset cricketers